German submarine U-390 was a Type VIIC U-boat of Nazi Germany's Kriegsmarine during World War II.

She carried out three patrols before being sunk by British warships 5 July 1944 in the English Channel.

She was a member of four wolfpacks.

Design
German Type VIIC submarines were preceded by the shorter Type VIIB submarines. U-390 had a displacement of  when at the surface and  while submerged. She had two shafts and two  propellers.

U-390 was fitted with five  torpedo tubes (four fitted at the bow and one at the stern), fourteen torpedoes, one  SK C/35 naval gun, 220 rounds, and two twin  C/30 anti-aircraft guns. The boat had a complement of between forty-four and sixty.

Service history
The submarine was laid down on 6 December 1941 at the Howaldtswerke yard at Kiel as yard number 21, launched on 23 January 1943 and commissioned on 13 March under the command of Oberleutnant zur See Heinz Geissler.

First patrol
The boat's first patrol was divided into two parts; the first part was brief. It started in Kiel and terminated in Bergen. Part two began in Bergen on 7 December 1943 and took in the gap between Iceland and the Faroe Islands. The submarine then docked at St. Nazaire in occupied France on 13 February 1944.

Second patrol
U-390s second foray was relatively uneventful; starting from St. Nazaire but finishing further north, at Brest.

Third patrol and loss
The U-boat's third and final sortie began three weeks after the Normandy landings. She torpedoed, but did not sink, the Sea Porpoise off Utah Beach with Woody Guthrie aboard on 5 July 1944 injuring 12 of the crew. On the same day she attacked and sank the British anti-submarine trawler . Also on the same day, she was sunk by depth charges dropped by two other British ships: the destroyer  and the frigate .

Forty-eight men died in U-390; there was one survivor rescued by Wanderer.

Wolfpacks
U-390 took part in four wolfpacks, namely:
 Coronel 2 (15 – 17 December 1943) 
 Rügen 3 (23 December 1943 – 7 January 1944) 
 Rügen (7 – 26 January 1944) 
 Stürmer (26 January – 3 February 1944)

Summary of raiding history

References

Bibliography

External links

German Type VIIC submarines
U-boats commissioned in 1943
U-boats sunk in 1944
U-boats sunk by British warships
U-boats sunk by depth charges
1943 ships
Ships built in Kiel
World War II submarines of Germany
World War II shipwrecks in the English Channel
Maritime incidents in July 1944
Maritime incidents in December 1945